The Giugiaro Mustang is a concept car based on the production fifth generation Ford Mustang that debuted at the 2006 Los Angeles International Auto Show. It was designed by Italdesign Giugiaro under Fabrizio Giugiaro, Giorgetto Giugiaro's son. The 2015 Ford Mustang takes many design cues from the concept car.

Styling 
In 2005, Fabrizio Giugiaro, the styling director of Italdesign Giugiaro, went to Ford to design a future concept inspired by the fifth generation Ford Mustang. This follows the pattern of Giorgetto Giugiaro, who was instrumental in designing the 1965 Bertone Mustang, as well as the Chevrolet Corvette Moray. It is the younger automobile designer's interpretation of European styling on the 2005 version of the American pony car.

Italdesign Giugiaro changed the styling and design of both the interior as well as the exterior. A single pane forms the windshield as well as the roof, which is made from a type of crystal that filters out all UV rays, yet does not polarize visible light. The doors are touch operated and when opened raise from the A-pillar at a 45 degree angle, similar to the classic Lamborghini's scissor doors. Inside, the interior is trimmed with aluminum and leather. The dashboard, door panels, dials and knobs, instrument cluster, as well as gear lever have been completely redesigned. The car also utilizes reverse cameras on both doors in place of conventional side view mirrors. New periscope-style air conditioning vents, along with a new seat trim, harkens to the pony car's name with furred horse hides.

Engineering 
The Giugiaro Mustang is powered by the 4.6 L V8 from the Mustang GT, but receives additional power from a twin-screw supercharger. The engine is tuned by Italdesign Giugiaro, fitted with fuel injectors from the Ford GT, and has a larger air intake with  mass air meter and a conical air filter. Exhaust flow is improved using an X-pipe and Ford Racing mufflers.

The Giugiaro Mustang  is equipped with a custom Ford Racing handling package, featuring new shock absorbers, lower springs, and thicker sway bars.

References 
 LA Auto Show: Giugiaro's Mustang hotness revealed! AutoBlog. Autoblog. Retrieved on 2007-01-11.

External links 

 Mustang by Giugiaro - Official Italian site

Ford Mustang
Ford concept vehicles